The Liberation Front of the State of Cabinda (FLEC (Lopes)) is a separatist movement seeking the independence of the Angolan province of Cabinda. It was founded in the Netherlands in 1996 by a group of Cabindese expatriates.

See also 
 African independence movements
 List of active autonomist and secessionist movements
 Angolan Civil War

Notelist

References

External links 
 

Secessionist organizations
Political parties established in 1996
National liberation movements in Africa
Cabinda independence movement
Rebel groups in Angola